Scott Anderson (born 8 January 1986) is an Australian former professional rugby league footballer who played in the 2000 and 2010s. He played for the Wakefield Trinity Wildcats of the Super League. A , he previously played for the Melbourne Storm. He also played for the Brisbane Broncos.

Playing career

Melbourne Storm
Anderson played from the interchange bench in Melbourne's 2008 NRL Grand Final loss to Manly. The following season he played in the 2009 NRL Grand Final victory over the Parramatta Eels, again from the bench.  This premiership was later stripped in 2010 due to the club's multiple and deliberate breaches of the salary cap.

Brisbane Broncos
On 12 November 2009 it was announced he had signed with the Brisbane Broncos on a two-year deal.

Wakefield Trinity Wildcats
Anderson signed with the Wildcats in 2013, joining the club for the 2014 season, originally on a one-year contract.

He retired from rugby league at the end of the 2016 season.

Statistics

References

External links
 Scott Anderson at the Brisbane Broncos official website

1986 births
Living people
Australian rugby league players
Australian expatriate sportspeople in England
Brisbane Broncos players
Melbourne Storm players
Norths Devils players
Rugby league players from Nambour, Queensland
Rugby league props
Wakefield Trinity players